Nawaf Mubarak Al-Darmaki (born 31 August 1981) is an Emirati football defender who played for United Arab Emirates in the 2004 Asian Cup. He also played for Al Sharjah and Bani Yas.

External links

Goal.com Profile

1981 births
Living people
2004 AFC Asian Cup players
Sharjah FC players
Baniyas Club players
Al Ahli Club (Dubai) players
Al Urooba Club players
Place of birth missing (living people)
UAE First Division League players
UAE Pro League players
Footballers at the 2002 Asian Games
Association football wingers
Emirati footballers
United Arab Emirates international footballers
Asian Games competitors for the United Arab Emirates
Association football defenders
2007 AFC Asian Cup players